Spathopsis is a genus of fresh-water mussel; it is a bivalve or clam which is in the family Iridinidae.

It contains the following species:
 Spathopsis wissmanni
 Spathopsis rubens

References

Unionida
Bivalve genera
Taxonomy articles created by Polbot